Cheirodonta pallescens is a species of gastropods belonging to the family Triphoridae.

The species is found in Southern Europe.

References

Triphoridae
Gastropods described in 1867
Gastropods of Europe